Elections to the Senate of Cameroon were held on 12 March 2023.

Electoral system 
The Senate has 100 seats, of which 70 are elected and 30 appointed by the President, with each region having 10 Senators. The elected seats are elected by the 10,636 members of the 360 municipal councils.

Elections to the Senate were held for the first time on 14 April 2013. Marcel Niat Njifenji was elected as President of the Senate on 12 June 2013. The President of the Senate is the constitutionally designated successor to the President of the Republic in case of a vacancy in the latter office.

References

See also 

 Politics of Cameroon

2023 elections in Africa
2023 in Cameroon
Elections in Cameroon
March 2023 events in Africa